The first cabinet of Ingvar Carlsson was the cabinet of Sweden between 12 March 1986 and February 1990. The cabinet was formed as a direct consequence of the assassination of the incumbent prime minister Olof Palme on 28 February 1986. After which the Speaker of the Parliament, Ingemund Bengtsson, in accordance with the Constitution of Sweden discharged all ministers.

In the course of the first cabinet of Ingvar Carlsson, Sweden — as well as most other western countries in the late 80s — enjoyed a period of economic expansion. The cabinet undertook a  reform of the Swedish tax system, which meant that more income tax went directly to the municipalities, instead of the state.  The reform also meant that a flat capital gains tax was implemented. During these years Sweden saw two widely publicised political scandals; the Ebbe Carlsson affair and the Bofors scandal.

Politics
After the assassination of prime minister Olof Palme on 28 February 1986, the second cabinet of Palme continued to serve as an interim cabinet (sv. expeditionsregering) led by Deputy Prime Minister Ingvar Carlsson until 12 March 1986. The cabinet of Carlsson acceded formally that day, after Carlsson had been elected prime minister by the parliament with 178 votes for and 0 against. 159 members refrained from voting, and 12 were not present.

Apart from the new prime minister, the first cabinet of Carlsson was almost identical with the second cabinet of Palme. However the Minister for Energy Affairs, also acceded Carlsson's former office as Minister of the Environment

Foreign Affairs

Between 14 and 17 April 1986 the Prime Minister made a visit to Moscow. The purpose of the visit was to discuss the ongoing border dispute between Sweden and Soviet in the Baltic Sea. The exact stretch of the border had been a matter of disagreement since the late 1960s. Both parties wanted to draw the border through the middle of the Baltic Sea, however they did not agree on what constituted the middle. They disputed area consisted of 13 500 km².

Sweden wanted to draw the border in a middle, calculated between Gotland and the Baltic states, while Soviet wanted to the count from the Swedish mainland. The Soviet proposal would have meant a borderline stretching just east of Gotland.

In January 1988, the Premier of the Soviet Union, Nikolai Ryzhkov made an official visit to Stockholm. Among the issues discussed was the border dispute. It was decided that Sweden were to be given seventy-five percents of the disputed area, while the Soviet Union received the remaining twenty-five percents. Furthermore, the two parties agree on a transition of fishing  regulations for the coming twenty years.

In the middle of 1986 a debate concerning whether or not Sweden should implement a complete trade embargo towards apartheid South Africa emerged. Denmark and Norway had already announced that they intended to implement an embargo. The Centre Party, the Liberal People's Party, the Social Democratic Youth League, the league of Social Democratic Women in Sweden and the Swedish Association of Christian Social Democrats had all announced their support of an embargo.

Import of agricultural products had already been prohibited on 1 January 1986. The Prime Minister, however, wanted to wait on the decision of the United Nations Security Council. On 12 March 1987 the decision to implement a complete trade embargo towards South Africa and Namibia, starting on 1 July the same year, was taken.

In May 1988, Carlsson traveled to the capitols of several of the member states of the European Economic Community (EEC). The Prime Minister visited Madrid, Brussels, Bonn and London. The purpose of the visits was to explain Sweden's attitude towards the EEC. Carlsson line was that Sweden was to collaborate with the EEC in all areas except, foreign policy, where Sweden's policy of neutrality hindered it from participate. Therefore, Sweden could not become a member of the EEC.

Early in 1988 the Minister of Foreign Affairs Sten Andersson visited Syria, Jordan and Israel. On 6 December 1988 the chairman of the Palestine Liberation Organization Yasser Arafat visited Sweden on an official state visit to Stockholm. During his visit, Arafat acknowledge Israel's right to exist and condemned terror as a weapon.

In November the following year Sten Andersson visited the Baltic states, where he declared that the Baltic states were not occupied by the Soviet Union. For this statement Andersson received severe criticism in Sweden. In his memoirs the minister defends his statement, writing that the Baltic states were annexed which, according to Public international law, is not the same thing as occupation.

The Ebbe Carlsson affair and the Bofors scandal

Several widely publicised political scandals took place during 1987. In March the Indian newspapers the Indian Express and The Hindu accused  the then Indian Prime Minister Rajiv Gandhi and several others of receiving kickbacks from the Swedish weapons producer Bofors for winning a bid to supply India's 155 mm field howitzer. The scale of the corruption was far worse than any that India had seen before, and directly led to the defeat of Gandhi's ruling Indian National Congress party in the November 1989 general elections. The affair became known as the Bofors scandal.

During the night between 5 and 6 October Stig Bergling, a former officer in the Swedish Security Service who had been convicted of espionage on behalf of the Soviet Union, managed to escape while on furlough. After receiving heavy criticism, the Minister of Justice Sten Wickbom resigned on 19 October. During the year the much troubled police investigation of the assassination of Olof Palme lingered on. Due to failure to present results the Stockholm county administrative chief of police Hans Holmér was forced to resign.

On 1 June 1988 the Ebbe Carlsson affair started, when the newspaper Expressen revealed that the publisher Ebbe Carlsson had been given access to top secret documents concerning the Palme investigation. The new Minister of Justice Anna-Greta Leijon, who had authorised Ebbe Carlsson's involvement in the investigation, resigned on 7 June.

Energy and Environment policy
Shortly before Christmas 1985, the Minister of the Environment and Energy Affairs Birgitta Dahl, pledged to present a plan to phase out nuclear power in Sweden by 1995. After the 1986 Chernobyl accident in Ukraine, an expert committee was formed by the government. The committee was to investigate the security of nuclear energy. To form a broad consensus regarding the future of nuclear energy in Sweden, the cabinet invited the other political parties for discussion. On 12 February 1987 the discussions failed. The following day Dahl announced that the government intended to start the phase out between 1990 and 1997. In the beginning of 1987 they presented a Motion (parliamentary procedure) to close the first nuclear reactor sometime in the period 1993–1995 and the second during 1994–1996.

In 1988 the Moderate Party proposed a national Carbon dioxide limit. Which meant that nuclear power plants could not be replaced by fossil fuel power plants. The same year the cabinet revised their nuclear proposition; now the first reactor was to be closed by 1995, and the second by 1996. The plants where reactors were to be closed were Barsebäck and Ringhals. Dahl declared that the decision was "irreversible." But after debates in parliament the Liberal People's Party and the Centre Party, together with members of the social democratic party, reverted the decision in 1991.

Social policy
The Social Democratic Party wanted to raise child allowances and extend parental allowance. By 28 February the Moderate Party, the Centre Party, and the Liberal People's Party had left the negotiations. The Centre Party later returned to negotiations, and with support from them and the Left Party the proposition passed. The new law meant that child allowance was raised from 400 SEK/month to 485 SEK/month.

General election, 1988
 

Before the general election in 1988, the three conservative parties agree on a proposal to implement a taxed health care allowance on 15 000 SEK per child and year. Cost of childcare up to the same amount would be deductible in the declaration. In total the proposal would have costed 8 billion Swedish crowns. The social democrats instead wanted to extend parental allowance during a period of three years, from nine to eight months. The Social Democrat's proposal were to cost 5,5 billions. The Social Democratic Party lost three seats in the election. The communistic Left Party gained one seat. The Green Party passed the election threshold for the first time, receiving 5.5 percent of the votes and thus twenty seats in parliament. The conservative parties together lost nineteen seats.

Economic policy

Resignation of the cabinet

Labor market debate, 1990

Ministers 

|}

Secretaries of State

Bibliography

Notes

External links 

Cabinets of Sweden
1986 establishments in Sweden
1990 disestablishments in Sweden
Cabinets established in 1986
Cabinets disestablished in 1990